The 2014 Get To Know Newton 250 presented by Sherwin-Williams was the tenth stock car race of the 2014 NASCAR Nationwide Series season, and the fourth iteration of the event. The race was held on Sunday, May 18, 2014, in Newton, Iowa at Iowa Speedway, a 7⁄8 mile (1.4 km) permanent D-shaped oval racetrack. On the final restart with 21 to go, Joe Gibbs Racing driver Sam Hornish Jr. would manage to hold off the field to win his third career NASCAR Nationwide Series victory and his only win of the season. To fill out the podium, Team Penske driver Ryan Blaney and JR Motorsports driver Regan Smith would finish second and third, respectively.

Background 

It has over 25,000 permanent seats as well as a unique multi-tiered RV viewing area along the backstretch.

Entry list 

 (R) denotes rookie driver.
 (i) denotes driver who is ineligible for series driver points.

Practice

First practice 
The first practice session was held on Friday, May 16, at 9:00 AM CST. The session would last for three hours.

Second practice 
The second practice session was held on Friday, May 16, at 1:00 PM CST. The session would last for two hours.

Third practice 
The third practice session was held on Friday, May 16, at 3:30 PM CST. The session would last for one hour and 20 minutes.

Final practice 
The final practice session, sometimes referred to as Happy Hour, was held on Saturday, May 17, at 11:30 AM CST. The session would last for one hour and 30 minutes.

Qualifying 
Qualifying was held on Saturday, May 17, at 6:10 PM CST. Since Iowa Speedway is under  in length, the qualifying system was a multi-car system that included two rounds. The first round was 30 minutes, where every driver would be able to set a lap within the 30 minutes. Then, the second round would consist of the fastest 12 drivers in round 1, and drivers would have 10 minutes to set a time. Whoever set the fastest time in round 2 would win the pole.

No drivers would fail to qualify.

Full qualifying results

Race results

Standings after the race 

Drivers' Championship standings

Note: Only the first 10 positions are included for the driver standings.

References 

2014 NASCAR Nationwide Series
NASCAR races at Iowa Speedway
May 2014 sports events in the United States
2014 in sports in Iowa